HMS Adamant was a World War II submarine depot ship.

Completed in 1942, she served in the Eastern Fleet (Colombo/Trincomalee) with the 4th Submarine Flotilla (comprising nine T-class boats) from April 1943 until April 1945 and then moved with her flotilla to Fremantle, Australia. In 1950, she returned to England, where she remained until 1954 as flagship of the Senior Officer, Reserve Fleet, Portsmouth. In 1953 she took part in the Fleet Review to celebrate the Coronation of Queen Elizabeth II.

In October 1954, she was commissioned as depot ship to the 3rd Submarine Squadron at Rothesay, where she was based until October 1957. She then moved further up the Clyde to Faslane on Gare Loch (1959 - 1962), ending the permanent RN presence at Rothesay. In early 1963, she moved to the 2nd Submarine Squadron at Devonport. In March 1966 she was listed for disposal. In September 1970 she arrived at Inverkeithing to be broken up.

Adamant was capable of servicing up to nine submarines at a time while accommodating their crews. Her on-board facilities included a foundry, light and heavy machine shops, electrical and torpedo repair shops, and equipment to support fitters, patternmakers, coppersmiths and shipwrights. After the war, the increased technical sophistication of submarines, and the concomitant increase in the number of technical staff required to service them, reduced her support capacity to six submarines at a time.

In 1963, all her original guns were removed and replaced by two quadruple and two twin Bofors 40 mm gun  mounts. Her design included one-inch torpedo bulkhead  inboard, and two-inch steel armour to protect her middle deck.

References

External links
More info about the post-WWII Navy on the Scottish West Coast
Photo of HMS Adamant in the Pacific
Barrow Submariners Association
Submarines of WWII - Depot Ships
Allied Warships - uboat.net

Auxiliary ships of the Royal Navy
Ships built in Belfast
Cold War fleet auxiliaries of the United Kingdom
World War II naval ships of the United Kingdom
1940 ships
Ships built by Harland and Wolff
Royal Navy Submarine Depot Ships